Jesús Gil (born 5 September 1951) is a Cuban fencer. He competed in the individual and team foil events at the 1968 and 1972 Summer Olympics.

References

1951 births
Living people
Cuban male fencers
Olympic fencers of Cuba
Fencers at the 1968 Summer Olympics
Fencers at the 1972 Summer Olympics
Sportspeople from Havana
Pan American Games medalists in fencing
Pan American Games silver medalists for Cuba
Fencers at the 1971 Pan American Games
20th-century Cuban people
21st-century Cuban people